The Reventazón Dam is a concrete-face rock-fill dam on the Reventazón River about  southwest of Siquirres in Limón Province, Costa Rica. It was inaugurated on 16 September 2016, and its primary purpose is the production of hydroelectric power. The US$1.4 billion project and largest power station in the country has an installed capacity of 305.5 MW and is expected to provide power for 525,000 homes. Construction on the dam began in 2009.
Due to its environmental features, like offset habitats and migration corridors for jaguars and many other species, the project could be a model for other future hydroelectric power plants.

See also 

 List of power stations in Costa Rica

References

Dams in Costa Rica
Concrete-face rock-fill dams
Buildings and structures in Limón Province
Hydroelectric power stations in Costa Rica